The Arthashastra is an Ancient Indian Sanskrit treatise on statecraft, political science, economic policy and military strategy. Kautilya, also identified as Vishnugupta and Chanakya, is traditionally credited as the author of the text. The latter was a scholar at Takshashila, the teacher and guardian of Mauryan emperor Chandragupta Maurya. Some scholars believe them to be the same person, while a few have questioned this identification. The text is likely the work of several authors over centuries. Composed, expanded and redacted between the 2nd century BCE and 3rd century CE, the Arthashastra was influential until the 12th century, when it disappeared. It was rediscovered in 1905 by R. Shamasastry, who published it in 1909. The first English translation, also by Shamasastry, was published in 1915. After a dormant reception, primarily confined to the academic circles, the conversation around Arthashastra in 21st century has generated sudden global interest specially amongst global power-predictors, who are trying to decipher what a rising India would mean for the world, as it is anticipated to reflect the indigenous model of Shakti as defined by Kautilya Arthashastra. It has a unique approach to defining Power of the nation states.

The Sanskrit title, Arthashastra, can be translated as "political science" or "economic science" or simply "statecraft", as the word artha (अर्थ) is polysemous in Sanskrit; the work has a broad scope. It includes books on the nature of government, law, civil and criminal court systems, ethics, economics, markets and trade, the methods for screening ministers, diplomacy, theories on war, nature of peace, and the duties and obligations of a king. The text incorporates Hindu philosophy, includes ancient economic and cultural details on agriculture, mineralogy, mining and metals, animal husbandry, medicine, forests and wildlife.

The Arthashastra explores issues of social welfare, the collective ethics that hold a society together, advising the king that in times and in areas devastated by famine, epidemic and such acts of nature, or by war, he should initiate public projects such as creating irrigation waterways and building forts around major strategic holdings and towns and exempt taxes on those affected. The text was influenced by Hindu texts that such as the sections on kings, governance and legal procedures included in Manusmriti.

History of the manuscripts

The text was considered lost by colonial era scholars, until a manuscript was discovered in 1905. A copy of the Arthashastra in Sanskrit, written on palm leaves, was presented by a Tamil Brahmin from Tanjore to the newly opened Mysore Oriental Library headed by Benjamin Lewis Rice. The text was identified by the librarian Rudrapatna Shamasastry as the Arthashastra. During 1905–1909, Shamasastry published English translations of the text in installments, in journals Indian Antiquary and Mysore Review.

During 1923–1924, Julius Jolly and Richard Schmidt published a new edition of the text, which was based on a Malayalam script manuscript in the Bavarian State Library. In the 1950s, fragmented sections of a north Indian version of Arthashastra were discovered in form of a Devanagari manuscript in a Jain library in Patan, Gujarat. A new edition based on this manuscript was published by Muni Jina Vijay in 1959. In 1960, R. P. Kangle published a critical edition of the text, based on all the available manuscripts. Numerous translations and interpretations of the text have been published since then.

The text written in Sanskrit of the 1st millennium BCE Sanskrit, which is coded, dense and capable of many interpretations, especially as English and Sanskrit are very different languages, both grammatically and syntactically. Patrick Olivelle, whose translation was published in 2013 by Oxford University Press, said it was the "most difficult translation project I have ever undertaken." Parts of the text are still opaque after a century of modern scholarship.

Authorship, date of writing, and structure
The authorship and date of writing are unknown, and there is evidence that the surviving manuscripts are not original and have been modified in their history but were most likely completed in the available form between 2nd-century BCE to 3rd-century CE. Olivelle states that the surviving manuscripts of the Arthashastra are the product of a transmission that has involved at least three major overlapping divisions or layers, which together consist of 15 books, 150 chapters and 180 topics. The first chapter of the first book is an ancient table of contents, while the last chapter of the last book is a short 73 verse epilogue asserting that all thirty-two Yukti–elements of correct reasoning methods–were deployed to create the text.

A notable structure of the treatise is that while all chapters are primarily prose, each transitions into a poetic verse towards its end, as a marker, a style that is found in many ancient Hindu Sanskrit texts where the changing poetic meter or style of writing is used as a syntax code to silently signal that the chapter or section is ending. All 150 chapters of the text also end with a colophon stating the title of the book it belongs in, the topics contained in that book (like an index), the total number of titles in the book and the books in the text. Finally, the Arthashastra text numbers it 180 topics consecutively, and does not restart from one when a new chapter or a new book starts.

The division into 15, 150, and 180 of books, chapters and topics respectively was probably not accidental, states Olivelle, because ancient authors of major Hindu texts favor certain numbers, such as 18 Parvas in the epic Mahabharata. The largest book is the second, with 1,285 sentences, while the smallest is eleventh, with 56 sentences. The entire book has about 5,300 sentences on politics, governance, welfare, economics, protecting key officials and king, gathering intelligence about hostile states, forming strategic alliances, and conduct of war, exclusive of its table of contents and the last epilogue-style book.

Authorship 

Stylistic differences within some sections of the surviving manuscripts suggest that it likely includes the work of several authors over the centuries. There is no doubt, states Olivelle, that "revisions, errors, additions and perhaps even subtractions have occurred" in Arthashastra since its final redaction in 300 CE or earlier.

Three names for the text's author are used in various historical sources:

 Kauṭilya or Kauṭalya
 The text identifies its author by the name "Kauṭilya" or its variant "Kauṭalya": both spellings appear in manuscripts, commentaries, and references in other ancient texts; it is not certain which one of these is the original spelling of the author's name. This person was probably the author of the original recension of Arthashastra: this recension must have been based on works by earlier writers, as suggested by the Arthashastra's opening verse, which states that its author consulted the so-called "Arthashastras" to compose a new treatise.
 Vishakhadatta's Mudrarakshasa refers to Kauṭilya as kutila-mati ("crafty-minded"), which has led to suggestions that the word "Kauṭilya" is derived from kutila, the Sanskrit word for "crafty". However, such a derivation is grammatically impossible, and Vishkhadatta's usage is simply a pun. The word "Kauṭilya" or "Kauṭalya" appears to be the name of a gotra (lineage), and is used in this sense in the later literature and inscriptions.

 Vishnugupta
 A verse at the end of the text identifies its author as "Vishnugupta", stating that Vishnugupta himself composed both the text and its commentary, after noticing "many errors committed by commentators on treatises". R. P. Kangle theorized that Vishnugupta was the personal name of the author while Chanakya was the name of his gotra. Others, such as Thomas Burrow and Patrick Olivelle, point out that none of the earliest sources that refer to Chanakya mention the name "Vishnugupta". According to these scholars, "Vishnugupta" may have been the personal name of the author whose gotra name was "Kautilya": this person, however, was different from Chanakya. Historian K C Ojha theorizes that Vishnugupta was the redactor of the final recension of the text.

 Chanakya
 The penultimate paragraph of the Arthashastra states that the treatise was authored by the person who rescued the country from the Nanda kings, although it does not explicitly name this person. The Maurya prime minister Chanakya played a pivotal role in the overthrow of the Nanda dynasty. Several later texts identify Chanakya with Kautilya or Vishnugupta: Among the earliest sources, Mudrarakshasa is the only one that uses all three names - Kauṭilya, Vishnugupta, and Chanakya - to refer to the same person. Other early sources use the name Chanakya (e.g. Panchatantra), Vishnugupta (e.g. Kamandaka's Nitisara), both Chanakya and Vishnugupta (Dandin's Dashakumaracharita), or Kautilya (e.g. Bana's Kadambari). The Puranas (Vishnu, Vayu, and Matsya) are the only among the ancient texts that use the name "Kautilya" (instead of the more common "Chanakya") to describe the Maurya prime minister.
 Scholars such as R. P. Kangle theorize that the text was authored by the Maurya prime minister Chanakya. Others, such as Olivelle and Thomas Trautmann, argue that this verse is a later addition, and that the identification of Chanakya and Kautilya is a relatively later development that occurred during the Gupta period. Trautmann points out that none of the earlier sources that refer to Chanakya mention his authorship of the Arthashastra. Olivelle proposes that in an attempt to present the Guptas as the legitimate successors of the Mauryas, the author of political treatise followed by the Guptas was identified with the Maurya prime minister.

Chronology 
Olivelle states that the oldest layer of text, the "sources of the Kauṭilya", dates from the period 150 BCE–50 CE. The next phase of the work's evolution, the "Kauṭilya Recension", can be dated to the period 50–125 CE. Finally, the "Śāstric Redaction" (i.e., the text as we have it today) is dated period 175–300 CE.

The Arthasastra is mentioned and dozens of its verses have been found on fragments of manuscript treatises buried in ancient Buddhist monasteries of northwest China, Afghanistan and northwest Pakistan. This includes the Spitzer Manuscript (c. 200 CE) discovered near Kizil in China and the birch bark scrolls now a part of the Bajaur Collection (1st to 2nd century CE) discovered in the ruins of a Khyber Pakhtunkhwa Buddhist site in 1999, state Harry Falk and Ingo Strauch.

Geography 

The author of Arthashastra uses the term gramakuta to describe a village official or chief, which, according to Thomas Burrow, suggests that he was a native of the region that encompasses present-day Gujarat and northern Maharashtra. Other evidences also support this theory: the text mentions that the shadow of a sundial disappears at noon during the month of Ashadha (June-July), and that the day and night are equal during the months of Chaitra (March-April) and Ashvayuja (September-October). This is possible only in the areas lying along the Tropic of Cancer, which passes through central India, from Gujarat in the west to Bengal in the east.

The author of the text appears to be most familiar with the historical regions of Avanti and Ashmaka, which included parts of present-day Gujarat and Maharashtra. He provides precise annual rainfall figures for these historical regions in the text. Plus, he shows familiarity with sea-trade, which can be explained by the existence of ancient sea ports such as Sopara in the Gujarat-Maharashtra region. Lastly, the gotra name Kauṭilya is still found in Maharashtra.

Translation of the title
Different scholars have translated the word "arthashastra" in different ways.

 A.L. Basham: a "treatise on polity"
 D.D. Kosambi: "science of material gain"
 G.P. Singh: "science of polity"
 Roger Boesche: "science of political economy"
 Patrick Olivelle: "science of politics"

Artha (prosperity, wealth, purpose, meaning, economic security) is one of the four aims of human life in Hinduism (Puruṣārtha), the others being dharma (laws, duties, rights, virtues, right way of living), kama (pleasure, emotions, sex) and moksha (spiritual liberation).  is the Sanskrit word for "rules" or "science".

Organisation
Arthashastra is divided into 15 book titles, 150 chapters and 180 topics, as follows:
 On the Subject of Training, 21 chapters, Topics 1-18
 On the Activities of Superintendents, 36 chapters, Topics 19-56 (largest book)
 On Justices, 20 chapters, Topics 57-75
 Eradication of Thorns, 13 chapters, Topics 76-88
 On Secret Conduct, 6 chapters, Topics 89-95
 Basis of the Circle, 2 chapters, Topics 96-97
 On the Sixfold Strategy, 18 chapters, Topics 98-126
 On the Subject of Calamities, 5 chapters, Topics 127-134
 Activity of a King preparing to March into Battle, 7 chapters, Topics 135-146
 On War, 6 chapters, Topics 147-159
 Conduct toward Confederacies, 1 chapter, Topics 160-161
 On the Weaker King, 5 chapters, Topics 162-170
 Means of Capturing a Fort, 5 chapters, Topics 171-176
 On Esoteric Practices, 4 chapters, Topics 177-179
 Organization of a Scientific Treatise, 1 chapter, Topic 180

Contents

The need for law, economics and government
The ancient Sanskrit text opens, in chapter 2 of Book 1 (the first chapter is table of contents), by acknowledging that there are a number of extant schools with different theories on proper and necessary number of fields of knowledge, and asserts they all agree that the science of government is one of those fields. It lists the school of Brihaspati, the school of Usanas, the school of Manu and itself as the school of Kautilya as examples.

The school of Usanas asserts, states the text, that there is only one necessary knowledge, the science of government because no other science can start or survive without it. The school of Brihaspati asserts, according to Arthashastra, that there are only two fields of knowledge, the science of government and the science of economics (Varta of agriculture, cattle and trade) because all other sciences are intellectual and mere flowering of the temporal life of man. The school of Manu asserts, states Arthashastra, that there are three fields of knowledge, the Vedas, the science of government and the science of economics (Varta of agriculture, cattle and trade) because these three support each other, and all other sciences are special branch of the Vedas.

The Arthashastra then posits its own theory that there are four necessary fields of knowledge, the Vedas, the Anvikshaki (science of reasoning), the science of government and the science of economics (Varta of agriculture, cattle and trade). It is from these four that all other knowledge, wealth and human prosperity is derived. The Kautilya text thereafter asserts that it is the Vedas that discuss what is Dharma (right, moral, ethical) and what is Adharma (wrong, immoral, unethical), it is the Varta that explain what creates wealth and what destroys wealth, it is the science of government that illuminates what is Nyaya (justice, expedient, proper) and Anyaya (unjust, inexpedient, improper), and that it is Anvishaki (philosophy) that is the light of these sciences, as well as the source of all knowledge, the guide to virtues, and the means to all kinds of acts. He says of government in general:

Raja (king)
The best king is the Raja-rishi, the sage king.

The Raja-rishi has self-control and does not fall for the temptations of the senses, he learns continuously and cultivates his thoughts, he avoids false and flattering advisors and instead associates with the true and accomplished elders, he is genuinely promoting the security and welfare of his people, he enriches and empowers his people,  he lives a simple life and avoids harmful people or activities, he keeps away from another's wife nor craves for other people's property. The greatest enemies of a king are not others, but are these six: lust, anger, greed, conceit, arrogance and foolhardiness. A just king gains the loyalty of his people not because he is king, but because he is just.

Officials, advisors and checks on government
Book 1 and Book 2 of the text discusses how the crown prince should be trained and how the king himself should continue learning, selecting his key Mantri (ministers), officials, administration, staffing of the court personnel, magistrates and judges.

Topic 2 of the Arthashastra, or chapter 5 of Book 1, is dedicated to the continuous training and development of the king, where the text advises that he maintain a counsel of elders, from each field of various sciences, whose accomplishments he knows and respects. Topic 4 of the text describes the process of selecting the ministers and key officials, which it states must be based on king's personal knowledge of their honesty and capacity. Kautilya first lists various different opinions among extant scholars on how key government officials should be selected, with Bharadvaja suggesting honesty and knowledge be the screen for selection, Kaunapadanta suggesting that heredity be favored, Visalaksha suggesting that king should hire those whose weaknesses he can exploit, Parasara cautioning against hiring vulnerable people because they will try to find king's vulnerability to exploit him instead, and yet another who insists that experience and not theoretical qualification be primary selection criterion.

Kautilya, after describing the conflicting views on how to select officials, asserts that a king should select his Amatyah (ministers and high officials) based on the capacity to perform that they have shown in their past work, the character and their values that is accordance with the role. The Amatyah, states Arthashastra, must be those with following Amatya-sampat: well trained, with foresight, with strong memory, bold, well spoken, enthusiastic, excellence in their field of expertise, learned in theoretical and practical knowledge, pure of character, of good health, kind and philanthropic, free from procrastination, free from ficklemindedness, free from hate, free from enmity, free from anger, and dedicated to dharma. Those who lack one or a few of these characteristics must be considered for middle or lower positions in the administration, working under the supervision of more senior officials. The text describes tests to screen for the various Amatya-sampat.

The Arthashastra, in Topic 6, describes checks and continuous measurement, in secret, of the integrity and lack of integrity of all ministers and high officials in the kingdom. Those officials who lack integrity must be arrested. Those who are unrighteous, should not work in civil and criminal courts. Those who lack integrity in financial matters or fall for the lure of money must not be in revenue collection or treasury, states the text, and those who lack integrity in sexual relationships must not be appointed to Vihara services (pleasure grounds). The highest level ministers must have been tested and have successfully demonstrated integrity in all situations and all types of allurements.

Chapter 9 of Book 1 suggests that the king maintain a council and a Purohit (chaplain, spiritual guide) for his personal counsel. The Purohit, claims the text, must be one who is well educated in the Vedas and its six Angas.

Causes of impoverishment, lack of motivation and disaffection among people

The Arthashastra, in Topic 109, Book 7 lists the causes of disaffection, lack of motivation and increase in economic distress among people. It opens by stating that wherever "good people are snubbed, and evil people are embraced" distress increases. Wherever officials or people initiate unprecedented violence in acts or words, wherever there is unrighteous acts of violence, disaffection grows. When the king rejects the Dharma, that is "does what ought not to be done, does not do what ought to be done, does not give what ought to be given, and gives what ought not to be given", the king causes people to worry and dislike him.

Anywhere, states Arthashastra in verse 7.5.22, where people are fined or punished or harassed when they ought not to be harassed, where those that should be punished are not punished, where those people are apprehended when they ought not be, where those who are not apprehended when they ought to, the king and his officials cause distress and disaffection. When officials engage in thievery, instead of providing protection against robbers, the people are impoverished, they lose respect and become disaffected.

A state, asserts Arthashastra text in verses 7.5.24 - 7.5.25, where courageous activity is denigrated, quality of accomplishments are disparaged, pioneers are harmed, honorable men are dishonored, where deserving people are not rewarded but instead favoritism and falsehood is, that is where people lack motivation, are distressed, become upset and disloyal.

In verse 7.5.33, the ancient text remarks that general impoverishment relating to food and survival money destroys everything, while other types of impoverishment can be addressed with grants of grain and money.

Civil, criminal law and court system

Book 3 of the Arthashastra, according to Trautmann, is dedicated to civil law, including sections relating to economic relations of employer and employee, partnerships, sellers and buyers. Book 4 is a treatise on criminal law, where the king or officials acting on his behalf, take the initiative and start the judicial process against acts of crime, because the crime is felt to be a wrong against the people of the state. This system, as Trautmann points out, is similar to European system of criminal law, rather than other historic legal system, because in the European (and Arthashastra) system it is the state that initiates judicial process in cases that fall under criminal statutes, while in the latter systems the aggrieved party initiates a claim in the case of murder, rape, bodily injury among others.

The ancient text stipulates that the courts have a panel of three pradeshtri (magistrates) for handling criminal cases, and this panel is different, separate and independent of the panel of judges of civil court system it specifies for a Hindu kingdom. The text lays out that just punishment is one that is in proportion to the crime in many sections starting with chapter 4 of Book 1, and repeatedly uses this principle in specifying punishments, for example in Topic 79, that is chapter 2 of Book 4. Economic crimes such as conspiracy by a group of traders or artisans is to be, states the Arthashastra, punished with much larger and punitive collective fine than those individually, as conspiracy causes systematic damage to the well-being of the people.

Marriage laws
The text discusses marriage and consent laws in Books 3 and 4. It asserts, in chapter 4.2, that a girl may marry any man she wishes, three years after her first menstruation, provided that she does not take her parents' property or ornaments received by her before the marriage. However, if she marries a man her father arranges or approves of, she has the right to take the ornaments with her.

In chapter 3.4, the text gives the right to a woman that she may remarry anyone if she wants to, if she has been abandoned by the man she was betrothed to, if she does not hear back from him for three menstrual periods, or if she does hear back and has waited for seven menses.

The chapter 2 of Book 3 of Arthashastra legally recognizes eight types of marriage. The bride is given the maximum property inheritance rights when the parents select the groom and the girl consents to the selection (Brahma marriage), and minimal if bride and groom marry secretly as lovers (Gandharva marriage) without the approval of her father and her mother. However, in cases of Gandharva marriage (love), she is given more rights than she has in Brahma marriage (arranged), if the husband uses the property she owns or has created, with husband required to repay her with interest when she demands.

Wildlife and forests
Arthashastra states that forests be protected and recommends that the state treasury be used to feed animals such as horses and elephants that are too old for work, sick or injured. However, Kautilya also recommends that wildlife that is damaging crops should be restrained with state resources. In Topic 19, chapter 2, the text suggests:

In topic 35, the text recommends that the "Superintendent of Forest Produce" appointed by the state for each forest zone be responsible for maintaining the health of the forest, protecting forests to assist wildlife such as elephants (hastivana), but also producing forest products to satisfy economic needs, products such as Teak, Palmyra, Mimosa, Sissu, Kauki, Sirisha, Catechu, Latifolia, Arjuna, Tilaka, Tinisa, Sal, Robesta, Pinus, Somavalka, Dhava, Birch, bamboo, hemp, Balbaja (used for ropes), Munja, fodder, firewood, bulbous roots and fruits for medicine, flowers. The Arthashastra also reveals that the Mauryas designated specific forests to protect supplies of timber, as well as lions and tigers, for skins.

Mines, factories and superintendents
The Arthashastra dedicates Topics 30 through 47 discussing the role of government in setting up mines and factories, gold and precious stone workshops, commodities, forest produce, armory, standards for balances and weight measures, standards for length and time measures, customs, agriculture, liquor, abattoirs and courtesans, shipping, domesticated animals such as cattle, horses and elephants along with animal welfare when they are injured or too old, pasture land, military preparedness and intelligence gathering operations of the state.

On spying, propaganda and information

The Arthashastra dedicates many chapters on the need, methods and goals of secret service, and how to build then use a network of spies that work for the state. The spies should be trained to adopt roles and guises, to use coded language to transmit information, and be rewarded by their performance and the results they achieve, states the text.

The roles and guises recommended for Vyanjana (appearance) agents by the Arthashastra include ascetics, forest hermits, mendicants, cooks, merchants, doctors, astrologers, householders, entertainers, dancers, female agents and others. It suggests that members from these professions should be sought to serve for the secret service. A prudent state, states the text, must expect that its enemies seek information and are spying inside its territory and spreading propaganda, and therefore it must train and reward double agents to gain identity about such hostile intelligence operations.

The goals of the secret service, in Arthashastra, was to test the integrity of government officials, spy on cartels and population for conspiracy, to monitor hostile kingdoms suspected of preparing for war or in war against the state, to check spying and propaganda wars by hostile states, to destabilize enemy states, to get rid of troublesome powerful people who could not be challenged openly. The spy operations and its targets, states verse 5.2.69 of Arthashastra, should be pursued "with respect to traitors and unrighteous people, not with respect to others".

On war and peace
The Arthashastra dedicates Book 7 and 10 to war, and considers numerous scenarios and reasons for war. It classifies war into three broad types – open war, covert war and silent war. It then dedicates chapters to defining each type of war, how to engage in these wars and how to detect that one is a target of covert or silent types of war. The text cautions that the king should know the progress he expects to make, when considering the choice between waging war and pursuing peace. The text asserts:

Kautilya, in the Arthashastra, suggests that the state must always be adequately fortified, its armed forces prepared and resourced to defend itself against acts of war. Kautilya favors peace over war, because he asserts that in most situations, peace is more conducive to creation of wealth, prosperity and security of the people. Arthashastra defines the value of peace and the term peace, states Brekke, as "effort to achieve the results of work undertaken is industry, and absence of disturbance to the enjoyment of the results achieved from work is peace".

All means to win a war are appropriate in the Arthashastra, including assassination of enemy leaders, sowing discord in its leadership, engagement of covert men and women in the pursuit of military objectives and as weapons of war, deployment of accepted superstitions and propaganda to bolster one's own troops or to demoralize enemy soldiers, as well as open hostilities by deploying kingdom's armed forces. After success in a war by the victorious just and noble state, the text argues for humane treatment of conquered soldiers and subjects.

The Arthashastra theories are similar with some and in contrast to other alternative theories on war and peace in the ancient Indian tradition. For example, states Brekke, the legends in Hindu epics preach heroism qua heroism which is in contrast to Kautilya suggestion of prudence and never forgetting the four Hindu goals of human life, while Kamandaki's Nitisara, which is similar to Kautilya's Arthashastra, is among other Hindu classics on statecraft and foreign policy that suggest prudence, engagement and diplomacy, peace is preferable and must be sought, and yet prepared to excel and win war if one is forced to.

Foreign Policy 

In the Arthashastra, Books 7, 11 and 12 have given a comprehensive analysis on all aspects of the relations between states. In the first chapter of Book 6, the theoretical basis of foreign policy are described.

On regulations and taxes
The Arthashastra discusses a mixed economy, where private enterprise and state enterprise frequently competed side by side, in agriculture, animal husbandry, forest produce, mining, manufacturing and trade. However, royal statutes and officials regulated private economic activities, some economic activity was the monopoly of the state, and a superintendent oversaw that both private and state owned enterprises followed the same regulations. The private enterprises were taxed. Mines were state owned, but leased to private parties for operations, according to chapter 2.12 of the text. The Arthashastra states that protecting the consumer must be an important priority for the officials of the kingdom.

Arthashastra stipulates restraint on taxes imposed, fairness, the amounts and how tax increases should be implemented. Further, state Waldauer et al., the text suggests that the tax should be "convenient to pay, easy to calculate, inexpensive to administer, equitable and non-distortive, and not inhibit growth. Fair taxes build popular support for the king, states the text, and some manufacturers and artisans, such as those of textiles, were subject to a flat tax. The Arthashastra states that taxes should only be collected from ripened economic activity, and should not be collected from early, unripe stages of economic activity. Historian of economic thought Joseph Spengler notes:

Agriculture on privately owned land was taxed at the rate of 16.67%, but the tax was exempted in cases of famine, epidemic, and settlement into new pastures previously uncultivated and if damaged during a war. New public projects such as irrigation and water works were exempt from taxes for five years, and major renovations to ruined or abandoned water works were granted tax exemption for four years. Temple and gurukul lands were exempt from taxes, fines or penalties. Trade into and outside the kingdom's borders was subject to toll fees or duties. Taxes varied between 10% to 25% on industrialists and businessmen, and it could be paid in kind (produce), through labor, or in cash.

Pregnancy and Abortion 
For a woman convicted of murder, the sentence of drowning was executed a month after child birth. Pregnant women were also given free ferry rides. There was severe punishment for aborting a slave woman.

Translations and scholarship
The text has been translated and interpreted by Shamashastry, Kangle, Trautmann and many others. Recent translations or interpretations include those of Patrick Olivelle and McClish.

Influence and reception

Scholars state that the Arthashastra was influential in Asian history. Its ideas helped create one of the largest empires in South Asia, stretching from the borders of Persia to Bengal on the other side of the Indian subcontinent, with its capital Pataliputra twice as large as Rome under Emperor Marcus Aurelius.

Kautilya's patron Chandragupta Maurya consolidated an empire which was inherited by his son Bindusara and then his grandson Ashoka. With the progressive secularization of society, and with the governance-related innovations contemplated by the Arthashastra, India was "prepared for the reception of the great moral transformation ushered in by Ashoka", and the spread of Buddhist, Hindu and other ideas across South Asia, East Asia and southeast Asia.

Comparisons to Machiavelli
In 1919, a few years after the newly discovered Arthashastra manuscript's translation was first published, Max Weber stated:

More recent scholarship has disagreed with the characterization of Arthashastra as "Machiavellianism". Kautilya asserts in Arthashastra that, "the ultimate source of the prosperity of the kingdom is its security and prosperity of its people", a view never mentioned in Machiavelli's text. The text advocates land reform, where land is taken from landowners and farmers who own land but do not grow anything for a long time, and given to poorer farmers who want to grow crops but do not own any land.

Arthashastra declares, in numerous occasions, the need for empowering the weak and poor in one's kingdom, a sentiment that is not found in Machiavelli. "The king shall also provide subsistence to helpless women when they are carrying and also to the children they give birth to". Elsewhere, the text values not just powerless human life, but even animal life and suggests in Book 2 that horses and elephants be given food, when they become incapacitated from old age, disease or after war.

Views on the role of the state
Roger Boesche, who relied entirely on the 1969 translation by Kangle for his analysis of Arthashastra, and who criticized an alternative 1992 translation by Rangarajan, has called the Arthashastra as "a great political book of the ancient world". He interprets that the 1st millennium BCE text is grounded more like the Soviet Union and China where the state envisions itself as driven by the welfare of the common good, but operates an extensive spy state and system of surveillance. This view has been challenged by Thomas Trautmann, who asserts that a free market and individual rights, albeit a regulated system, are proposed by Arthashastra. Boesche is not summarily critical and adds:

Scholars disagree on how to interpret the document. Kumud Mookerji states that the text may be a picture of actual conditions in Kautilya's times. However, Bhargava states that given Kautilya was the prime minister, one must expect that he implemented the ideas in the book.

Views on property and markets
Thomas Trautmann states that the Arthashastra in chapter 3.9 recognizes the concept of land ownership rights and other private property, and requires the king to protect that right from seizure or abuse. That makes it unlike Soviet or China model of citizen's private property rights. There is no question, states Trautmann, that people had the power to buy and sell land. However, Trautmann adds, this does not mean that Kautilya was advocating a capitalistic free market economy. Kautilya requires that the land sale be staggered and grants certain buyers automatic "call rights", which is not free market. The Arthashastra states that if someone wants to sell land, the owner's kins, neighbors and creditors have first right of purchase in that order, and only if they do not wish to buy the land for a fair competitive price, others and strangers can bid to buy. Further, the price must be announced in front of witnesses, recorded and taxes paid, for the buy-sale arrangement to deemed recognized by the state. The "call rights" and staggered bid buying is not truly a free market, as Trautmann points out.

The text dedicates Book 3 and 4 to economic laws and a court system to oversee and resolve economic, contracts and market-related disputes. The text also provides a system of appeal in which three dharmastha (judges) consider contractual disputes between two parties, and considers profiteering and false claims to dupe customers a crime. The text, states Trautmann, thus anticipates market exchange and provides a framework for its functioning.

Book on strategy anticipating all scenarios

More recent scholarship presents a more nuanced reception for the text.

The text, states Sihag, is a treatise on how a state should pursue economic development and it emphasized "proper measurement of economic performance", and "the role of ethics, considering ethical values as the glue which binds society and promotes economic development".

Realism
India's former National Security Adviser, Shiv Shankar Menon, states: "Arthashastra is a serious manual on statecraft, on how to run a state, informed by a higher purpose, clear and precise in its prescriptions, the result of practical experience of running a state. It is not just a normative text but a realist description of the art of running a state". The text is useful, according to Menon, because in many ways "the world we face today is similar to the world that Kautilya operated in". He recommended reading of the book for broadening the vision on strategic issues.

In popular culture
 Mentioned in season 5 episode 22 of the TV show Blue Bloods
 Mentioned in season 3 Episode 1 of the TV show iZombie
 The novel Chanakya's Chant by Ashwin Sanghi
 The novel Blowback by Brad Thor
 Mentioned in Chandragupt Maurya (Hindi TV series telecast on Sony Entertainment Television)
 Telugu Movie Chanakya Chandragupta
 Mentioned in season 3 episode 5 of the TV show Dear White People
 Mentioned in the book Origin Story, A big history of everything by David Christian
 Mentioned in the book World Order by Henry Kissinger
 Subject of a BBC "In Our Time" podcast The Arthashastra.

See also
Artha and Purushartha – Indian philosophical concepts
Hindu philosophy
History of espionage
Matsya Nyaya
Nitisara
Rajamandala
Republic (Plato)
Tirukkural
Manusmriti
Politics (Aristotle)

Notes

References

Bibliography

 
 
 
 
 
 
 
Arthashastra-Studien, Dieter Schlingloff, Wiener Zeitschrift für die Kunde Süd- und Ostasiens, vol. 11, 1967, 44-80 + Abb. 1a-30, ISSN 0084-0084.
 Ratan Lal Basu and Raj Kumar Sen, Ancient Indian Economic Thought, Relevance for Today, Rawat Publications, New Delhi, 2008
 Shoham, Dany, and Michael Liebig. "The intelligence dimension of Kautilyan statecraft and its implications for the present." Journal of Intelligence History 15.2 (2016): 119–138. 
 Kautilya’s Arthashastra: Strategic Cultural Roots of India’s Contemporary Statecraft, by Kajari Kamal
 Understanding Kautilya’s Arthashastra, by Pradeep Kumar Gautam

External links
 Kautilya Arthashastra English translation by R. Shamasastry 1956 (revised edition with IAST diacritics and interwoven glossary)
 (First English translation, 1915 by R Shamasastry)
Arthashastra (English) (Another archive of 1915 R Shamasastry translation)
Arthaśāstra (Sanskrit, IAST-Translit), SARIT Initiative, The British Association for South Asian Studies and The British Academy

Hindu texts
Maurya Empire
Ancient Indian literature
Sanskrit texts
Political books
Military strategy books
Sanskrit books